Patissa latifuscalis is a moth in the family Crambidae. It was described by George Hampson in 1896. It is found in Assam, India.

The wingspan is about 26 mm. The forewings are white with a fuscous black costal area and a black basal patch, as well as a black medial band. There is a fuscous postmedial line on the hindwings.

References

Moths described in 1896
Schoenobiinae